Ran Iida (born 16 April 1979) is a Japanese snowboarder. She competed in the women's parallel giant slalom event at the 2002 Winter Olympics.

References

1979 births
Living people
Japanese female snowboarders
Olympic snowboarders of Japan
Snowboarders at the 2002 Winter Olympics
Sportspeople from Sapporo
Snowboarders at the 2003 Asian Winter Games
21st-century Japanese women